This article contains information about albums and singles released by of American musician and bandleader Ike Turner.

Overview 
In March 1951, Ike Turner and his band the Kings of Rhythm entered Sam Phillips' Memphis Recording Service, where they recorded several songs including the No. 1 R&B hit often regarded as the first rock 'n' roll record, "Rocket 88," featuring Jackie Brenston on vocals with the band credited as the Delta Cats. The recordings were licensed to Chess Records. 

As an A&R man in the early 1950s, Turner arranged for other artists, such as Howlin' Wolf, Elmore James, Roscoe Gordon, Bobby "Blue" Bland, Little Junior Parker and Little Milton, to record for Sun Records, Modern Records, and Modern's subsidiaries, including RPM Records.

As a session musician Turner contributed to many seminal blues records, including B.B. King's first two No. 1 singles "3 O'Clock Blues" and "You Know I Love You." Turner is featured on "Double Trouble" by Otis Rush and Albert King's first hit record "Don't Throw Your Love on Me So Strong." 

By 1954, Turner had made the transition from pianist to guitarist. He took his Kings of Rhythm to Cincinnati in 1956 to record for Federal Records. In 1959, Turner released two singles on Stevens Records under the anagram "Icky Renrut" because he was still under contract with Sun for several more months, and he didn't want to cause friction with Phillips. 

After Turner formed the Ike & Tina Turner Revue in 1960, he created various labels such as Sputnik, Teena, Prann, Innis, Sony and Sonja Records to release singles he wrote and/or produced for other artist. In the late 1960s and early 1970s, Turner released albums and singles on Pompeii Records and United Artists.

After decades of absence, Turner released the critically claimed albums Here and Now (2001) and  Risin' With The Blues (2006), the latter winning a Grammy award for Best Traditional Blues Album.

Studio albums 

 1962: Dance With Ike & Tina Turner's Kings of Rhythm, Sue 2003
1963: Rocks The Blues, Crown CLP-5367/CST-367
 1969: Ike Turner & The Kings of Rhythm: A Black Man's Soul, Pompeii SD-6003; reissue: Funky Delicacies DEL LP-0047 (2002)
 1972: Blues Roots, United Artists UAS-5576
1972: Strange Fruit, United Artists UAS-5560
1973: Confined To Soul, United Artists UA-LA051-F
 1973: Bad Dreams, United Artists UA-LA087-F
 1980: The Edge (featuring Tina Turner and Home Grown Funk), Fantasy F-9597
 1996: My Blues Country, Resurgent/Mystic MYSCD-115
 1996: Without Love...I Have Nothing, C-Ya Records
 2001: Here and Now, Ikon IKOCD-8850
 2006: Risin' With The Blues, Zoho Roots ZM-200611

Live albums 

 2002: Ike Turner's Kings Of Rhythm – The Resurrection: Live Montreux Jazz Festival, Isabel IS 640202
 2006: Ike Turner & The Kings Of Rhythm – Live In Concert, Charly Films CHF-F1014LF [DVD/2CD]

Selected compilations 

 1976: Sun – The Roots Of Rock, Volume 3: Delta Rhythm Kings, Charly CR 30103
 1976: I'm Tore Up, Red Lightnin' RL0016
 1981: Kings of Rhythm, Flyright FLY LP-578
 1984: Hey Hey, Red Lightin' RL-0047 [2LP]
 1990: Cobra Sessions 1958, P-Vine PCD-2161
 1991: Trailblazer, Charly R&B CD-CHARLY-263
 1993: Rocks The Blues, P-Vine PCD-3031/2 [2CD]
 1994: I Like Ike! The Best of Ike Turner, Rhino R2-71819
 1995: Rhythm Rockin' Blues, Ace CDCHD-553
 2000: Ike's Instrumentals (1954–1965), Ace CDCHD-782
 2001: The Sun Sessions, Varèse Sarabande 302 066 232 2
 2003: Ike Turner (Blues Kingpins Series), Virgin 82714
 2004: His Woman, Her Man: The Ike Turner Diaries— Unreleased Funk/Rock 1970–1973
 2004: The Bad Man: Rare & Unreissued Ike Turner Produced Recordings 1962–1965, Night Train International NTICD-7139
 2004: King Cobra: The Chicago Sessions, Fuel 2000 302 061 390 2
 2004: A Proper Introduction To Ike Turner/Jackie Brenston, Proper Intro CD-2048
 2006: The Chronological: Ike Turner 1951–1954, Classics (Blues & Rhythm Series) 5176
 2006: Early Times, Rev-Ola CRREV-173
 2008: Classic Early Sides 1952–1957, JSP 4203 [2CD]
 2011: Rocket 88: The Original 1951–1960 R&B and Rock & Roll Sides, Soul Jam 600803
 2011: That Kat Sure Could Play! (The Singles 1951 To 1957), Secret SECBX-025 [4CD]
 2011: Jack Rabbit Blues: The Singles of 1958–1960, Secret SECSP-041
 2012: Real Gone Rocket: Session Man Extraordinaire: Selected Singles 1951–59, Jerome JRCD002
 2012: Trouble Up The Road (The Recordings 1961), Secret SECCD-060
 2012: Ike Turner Studio Productions: New Orleans and Los Angeles 1963–1965, Ace CDCHD-1329
 2017: She Made My Blood Run Cold, Southern Routes SR-CD-3502
 2017: Sessionography Vol. 1, Real Gone RGMCD300
 2018: Ike Turner and the Kings of Rhythm: Trailblazin' the Blues 1951–1957, Jasmine JASMCD 3130

Singles

1950s

1960s

1970s–1980s

Uncredited recordings

Recordings as a sideman

Albums 
Howlin Wolf

 1962: Howling Wolf Sings the Blues (Crown CLP 5240) 
 1971: Going Back Home (Syndicate Chapter)

Albert King

 1962: The Big Blues (King)

Earl Hooker

 1969: Sweet Black Angel (Blue Thumb)

Sly and the Family Stone

 1971: There's a Riot Goin' On

Otis Rush

 2000: The Essential Otis Rush: The Classic Cobra Recordings 1956–1958 (Fuel 2000)

Gorillaz

 2005: Demon Days (Virgin)

Bobby "Blue" Bland

 2011: It's My Life, Baby: The Singles As & Bs 1951–1960 (Jasmine)

Other appearances

 2003: The Modern Downhome Blues Sessions, Volume 1: Arkansas & Mississippi (Ace CDCHD 876)
2003: The Modern Downhome Blues Sessions, Volume 2: Mississippi & Arkansas 1952 (Ace CDCHD 982)

Singles

Howlin' Wolf

Bobby "Blue" Bland

B.B. King

Roscoe Gordon

Boyd Gilmore

Little Junior Parker

Houston Boines

Charley Booker

Drifting Slim

The Prisonaires

Johnny Ace / Earl Forrest

Elmore James

Little Milton

Billy "The Kid" Emerson

Raymond Hill

Clayton Love

Dennis Binder

The Flairs

Richard Berry

The Gardenias

Otis Rush

Buddy Guy

Albert King

References

External links 

 Ike Turner credits on AllMusic

Discography
Rock music discographies
Rhythm and blues discographies
Blues discographies
Discographies of American artists